"Love Is Gone" is a 2007 song by David Guetta and Chris Willis

Love Is Gone may also refer to:

 "Love Is Gone", a song by Slander (DJs) and Dylan Matthew, from the 2022 album Thrive
 "Love Is Gone", a song by G-Eazy from the 2017 album The Beautiful & Damned (album)
 Love Is Gone (album) by Dommin, 2010